Hodoa Moaqat ( "temporary calm") is a 1994 album by the Cairo-based Libyan Arabpop singer Hamid Al-Shairi. The album features guest vocals from 1990s artist Egyptian singer Dalia.

Track list

References

1994 albums
Arabic-language albums
Hamid Al-Shairi albums